Prymnesin-B1 is a chemical with the molecular formula . It is a member of the prymnesins, a class of ladder-frame polyether phycotoxins made by the alga Prymnesium parvum. It is known to be toxic to fish. It is a so called "Type-B" prymnesin, which differ in the number of backbone cycles when compared to Type-A prymnesins like prymnesin-2.

Structures 
Prymnesins-B1 is formed of a large polyether polycyclic core with several conjugate double and triple bonds, chlorine and nitrogen heteroatoms and a single sugar moiety consisting of α-D-galactopyranose.

See also
 Prymnesin-1
 Prymnesin-2

References 

Phycotoxins
Polyether toxins
Primary alcohols
Secondary alcohols
Conjugated enynes
Organochlorides
Halohydrins
Halogen-containing natural products
Amines
Conjugated diynes
Glycosides
Heterocyclic compounds with 5 rings
Oxygen heterocycles